The I-35 Rivalry (officially the I-35 Maroon vs. Orange Rivalry Series) is a college rivalry between the Texas State University Bobcats (TXST) and the University of Texas at San Antonio Roadrunners (UTSA). It is named for the Interstate Highway that connects San Marcos, Texas, and San Antonio, Texas, the respective sites of both universities.

History

Series results

Start of a big rivalry (1991)
The rivalry dates back to 1991, when the University of Texas at San Antonio joined as a non-football member of the Southland Conference. Southwest Texas State University, which had jumped in the conference only four years prior, is located less than 60 miles from the UTSA main campus. Due to their proximity, conference membership, and status as emerging research universities, the rivalry began to develop. It was fostered by a desire to bring attention to collegiate athletics in Central Texas.

Eventually, a trophy was utilized in the mid-1990s to recognize the winner of the annual men's basketball game between the two universities. In 2007, the competition was expanded to all sports, with the new I-35 Series Trophy being awarded to the winner. Prior to this new moniker and point-based scheme, the rivalry's name was unofficial, with the term "I-35 rivalry" being used by other schools and teams to label their own athletic competitions.

In 2003, "Southwest Texas State University" became "Texas State University—San Marcos", a move designed to help propel the school from a regional institution to a recognized, tier one university, a similar direction that UTSA had envisioned for itself. In 2009, the University of Texas at San Antonio was designated as one of seven emerging tier one universities in the state. Texas State years after its rival, was upgraded to emerging tier one university status in January 2012 by the Texas Higher Education Coordinating Board. In 2013, "Texas State University—San Marcos" was renamed to simply "Texas State University", the school's seventh name in the history of its existence. The university's administration saw the new name both as a clarification due to its identity issues and a step away from local identity.

Western Athletic Conference (2012)
In 2012, big changes to the rivalry occurred. With the addition of both UTSA and Texas State to the Western Athletic Conference (WAC), the two schools met each other for the first time on a football field. The game, which took place on November 24, 2012, was heavily promoted by both teams. 39,032 fans witnessed the rivalry's first-ever football game, the highest attendance of any game on both teams' schedules and the most-attended conference game in the WAC that year. Although the game remained close throughout its duration, UTSA emerged victorious, 38–31, in its home field at the Alamodome. The teams signed contracts with two different conferences that year, with UTSA heading to Conference USA (C-USA) and Texas State going to the Sun Belt Conference (SBC).

Future of the rivalry (2013–present)
With the Bobcats and Roadrunners parting ways to different conferences in 2013, the fate of the rivalry remained uncertain.

On May 23, 2014, both Texas State and UTSA both announced an eight-game football series starting in 2017 in San Marcos. "With the proximity and similarities that we have, this could develop into a special college football rivalry," stated by the Texas State head coach Dennis Franchione. On January 23, 2020, Texas State and UTSA announced a further extension of the football series to 2031. However, scheduling beyond 2022 is subject to change, as the SBC expanded to 14 members in 2022, and UTSA will move from C-USA to the American Athletic Conference in 2023, bringing that league to 14 football members.

Game results

Men's basketball

Football

Footnotes

References

College sports rivalries in the United States
Texas State Bobcats
UTSA Roadrunners
1991 establishments in Texas
Sports competitions in San Antonio